Porthmadog Harbour railway station (formerly known as Portmadoc Harbour railway station) in Porthmadog (formerly Portmadoc), Gwynedd (formerly Merioneth), North Wales. It is the passenger terminus of two narrow gauge railways: the Ffestiniog Railway, which was opened in 1836 to carry dressed slate from the Quarries around Blaenau Ffestiniog to the sea port of Porthmadog, for export by sea; and the Welsh Highland Railway, incorporated in 1923, which ran to Dinas. After rebuilding in 1997-2011, the other terminus is at Caernarfon, in sight of the Castle.

History 
The station is built at the western end of the Cob, the great embankment across the Traeth Mawr, on a peninsula from Ynys Madoc constructed in 1842 to form a slate wharf and a harbour wall. It was opened for passenger service on 6 January 1865. Welsh Highland Railway trains served the station from 1923, with a short period when all passenger traffic was diverted to Portmadog New station near the crossing with the Cambrian railway, that building being long since demolished. The ill-funded WHR closed in 1936. Harbour Station was closed to passengers on 15 September 1939, although slate trains continued operating through the Second World War until 1946. The buildings continued to be in use as the principal offices of the Festiniog Railway Company and the home of Manager (Mr Robert Evans) including throughout the years of almost total closure from 1 August 1946 to 24 September 1954. The station reopened for passengers on 23 July 1955.

Welsh Highland Railway 

Since 2011, following completion of the Cross Town Rail Link (CTRL), the station is also the terminus of the Welsh Highland Railway, which is owned by the Festiniog Railway Company. This line runs trains, via the cross town link through Porthmadog, to Beddgelert, Rhyd Ddu, Waunfawr,  and Caernarfon. The WHR was closed to all traffic in 1936 and the track lifted during the War, but has been entirely rebuilt and even extended. Starting from Caernarfon in 1997, the final section (from Pont Croesor) was connected in 2009, with regular passenger services resuming in 2011.

Buildings 
The present stone buildings date from 1878/79, replacing earlier wooden buildings dismantled and reused elsewhere on the railway. The goods shed was added in 1880. The buildings were linked by a major extension in 1975. Passenger facilities include a booking and enquiry office, a large tourist and hobby shop, and a restaurant with licensed bar. The erection of the platform awning was completed in 1988.

Harbour Station is the head office and operational headquarters of the Festiniog Railway Company, marketed as Ffestiniog and Welsh Highland Railways.

Operations 
With the resumption of services in 1955, all traffic on the line has been controlled from an office in Harbour station, known simply as "Control". With the exception of some early morning and late night movements by works trains, this office is staffed constantly when passenger-carrying services are in operation. Its remit was expanded in 1997 with the commencement of public services on the Welsh Highland Railway between Caernarfon and Dinas and its subsequent expansion south towards Porthmadog. Additionally, for 2007 and 2008, when a connection was in use with the WHR(P), there was a requirement to coordinate with its operations on the new main line.

From 2011, with the WHR now connected to the station via the CTRL, a new short platform and point work was added to the eastward side of the existing platform structure/Spooners Bar. This being too short to hold the longer WHR trains, WHR trains were pulled onto the Cob; then a pilot locomotive was attached to the rear to drag the complete WHR train into the station. This operation was reversed on departure, and because of the need for both lines to use the Cob and the single platform, only one train could be in the station at any time. This was always a temporary solution, until funds could be found to rebuild the station.

Having foreseen this problem, the FR proposed a £1.3M rebuild of Harbour Station, to provide two separate and individually controllable platforms, each with their own run-round loops. The project took three years to complete, requiring extension of the Cob structure into the Irish Sea, compacting, extension of the platform, and finally a shift westwards of the alignment of the existing single platform and FR storage loops and sidings. A helpful grant from the Terminal Stations Improvement Scheme was arranged by the Welsh Government. Completed in March 2014 within the projected cost, the project delivered, as well as two platforms, a new electronically controlled signal box with a distinct FR heritage appearance. The signalling work won the Signalling Award at the 2014 National Railway Heritage Awards.

Services 

|-
|colspan=5|Interchange with Porthmadog on the Cambrian Line

See also 
 Porthmadog Network Rail station
 Porthmadog WHHR station

Sources

Further reading

External links 

 The Festiniog Railway Company (Ffestiniog and Welsh Highland Railways) website
 Ffestiniog Railway Timetables 
 Welsh Highland Railway Timetables
 Multimap Map of Porthmadog Harbour station

Heritage railway stations in Gwynedd
Ffestiniog Railway
Welsh Highland Railway
Porthmadog
Railway stations in Great Britain opened in 1865
Railway stations in Great Britain closed in 1939
Railway stations in Great Britain opened in 1955
1865 establishments in Wales
Railway stations serving harbours and ports in the United Kingdom